The territory of present-day Ukraine has been invaded or occupied a number of times throughout its history.

List

See also

 List of invasions
 List of wars involving Ukraine

References

Foreign relations of Ukraine
Ukraine
Military history of Ukraine

invasions and occupations
invasions and occupations
Invasions